{{Infobox film
| image          = Pacific Rim - Uprising (2018 film).jpg
| alt            = The four Jaeger robots are preparing for battle in the destroyed city with the weapons. The film's tagline, "Rise up", is displayed along the top.
| caption        = Theatrical release poster
| director       = Steven S. DeKnight
| writer         = 
| based_on       = 
| producer       = 
| starring       = 
| cinematography = Dan Mindel
| editing        = 
| music          = Lorne Balfe
| studio         = 
| distributor    = Universal Pictures
| released       = 
| runtime        = 111 minutes<ref>{{cite web|title=Pacific Rim Uprising" (12A)|url=https://bbfc.co.uk/releases/pacific-rim-uprising-2018|publisher=British Board of Film Classification|access-date= March 13, 2018 }}</ref>
| country        = United States
| language       = English
| budget         = $150–176 million
| gross          = $290.9million
}}Pacific Rim Uprising is a 2018 American science fiction  monster film directed by Steven S. DeKnight (in his feature-film directorial and writing debut), and written by DeKnight, Emily Carmichael, Kira Snyder and T.S. Nowlin. It is the sequel to the 2013 film Pacific Rim, the second film, and second installment overall in the Pacific Rim franchise. Guillermo del Toro, director of the first movie, serves as a producer; while production studios Legendary Pictures and Double Dare You Productions developed the movie. The sequel stars John Boyega, as well as Scott Eastwood, Cailee Spaeny, Jing Tian, Adria Arjona and Zhang Jin, with Rinko Kikuchi, Charlie Day, and Burn Gorman returning from the original film. The film takes place in 2035, ten years after the events of the original film. The story follows Jake Pentecost, who is given one last chance to live up to his father's legacy after Kaiju, giant sea monsters, are unleashed back into the world and aim to destroy it.

Principal photography began in November 2016 in Australia. The film's world premiere was held at Vue West End on March 15, 2018, and was released in the United States on March 23, 2018, by Universal Pictures (unlike its predecessor, which was released by Warner Bros. Pictures), in 2D, RealD 3D, IMAX 3D, and IMAX formats. With a gross of $290 million worldwide, the film was a box office disappointment. It also received mixed reviews; many critics considered it inferior to del Toro's film and criticized the scope, pacing, story, as well as the absent characters from the previous film and the underdeveloped new characters, while others praised the visual effects, action sequences, and performances of Boyega, Eastwood and Spaeny. It was followed in 2021 by a 14-episode animated series on Netflix.

Plot

In 2035, ten years after the Battle of the Breach, in which the portal created by the Precursors (through which they sent Kaiju) was closed, former Jaeger pilot Jake Pentecost—son of Stacker Pentecost—makes a living by stealing and selling Jaeger parts on the black market in Santa Monica, California. After he tracks part of a disabled Jaeger's power core to the secret workshop of fifteen-year-old Jaeger enthusiast Amara Namani, both are apprehended by the Pan-Pacific Defense Corps (PPDC) following an altercation between Amara's small, single-pilot Jaeger Scrapper and the law enforcement Jaeger November Ajax. Jake's adoptive sister and Japanese Senator Mako Mori persuades him to return to PPDC as an instructor to avoid prison, with Amara as his recruit.

Arriving at the China Shatterdome, Jake starts training Jaeger cadets with his estranged former co-pilot Nathan "Nate" Lambert. Nate and Mako explain that the Jaeger program is threatened by the Shao Corporation's new drone program, which offers to mass-produce Jaeger drones developed by Liwen Shao and Dr. Newton 'Newt' Geiszler. Mako is due to deliver a final assessment to determine the approval of the drones at a PPDC council meeting in Sydney, but is accidentally killed by a rogue Jaeger, Obsidian Fury, during an altercation with the latter and Gipsy Avenger, Jake and Nate's Jaeger, before she can. Her death prompts the PPDC council to authorize and deploy the drones immediately. Obsidian Fury escapes into the ocean before backup Jaegers can apprehend it.

Moments before her death, Mako had transmitted the location of a defunct Jaeger production facility in Siberia. Jake and Nate travel there in Gipsy Avenger, but Obsidian Fury destroys the complex and engages them in battle. Although Obsidian Fury initially has the upper hand, Gipsy Avenger is able to overpower the Jaeger. Upon removing its reactor, they find that Obsidian Fury was controlled not by humans, but by a Kaiju's secondary brain, which testing shows was grown on Earth.

When the drones reach their respective locations, their piloting operations are hijacked by cloned Kaiju brains secretly mounted onboard. The Kaiju-Jaeger hybrids simultaneously attack all Shatterdomes, inflicting heavy casualties and incapacitating almost all Jaegers. Newt and Dr. Hermann Gottlieb try to disable the drones, but the latter discovers that the former is behind the attack when he commands the Kaiju-Jaeger hybrids to open multiple breaches across the Pacific Rim. Newt's mind has been possessed by the Precursors—who forged a link when he and Hermann drifted with Kaiju brains—and reveals that he placed the brains in the drones to ensure the Precursors' plan would proceed. 

Although Liwen is able to destroy the drones, closing the breaches, three creatures, Hakuja, Shrikethorn, and Raijin had already emerged and reached Tokyo. The team realizes that the Precursors' true goal is to detonate Mount Fuji with the Kaijus' blood which will cause every volcano lining the Ring of Fire to erupt, releasing volcanic matter into the atmosphere and wiping out all life on Earth, simultaneously terraforming the planet for Precursor colonization.

The cadets are mobilized while Hermann and Liwen repair the PPDC's four salvageable Jaegers; Hermann develops Kaiju-blood-powered rockets, which launch the team to Tokyo. Although the Jaegers, including Gipsy Avenger, initially repel the three Kaiju, Newt merges them into a "Mega-Kaiju" using robotic parasites from one of Liwen's factories. Three of the four Jaegers are destroyed, leaving Gipsy Avenger as the only one remaining. Jake and Amara, replacing the injured Nate, pilot it against the Mega-Kaiju, with Liwen remote piloting Scrapper and aiding them by locating a rocket and welding it to Gipsy, which sends the Jaeger (with Scrapper holding on) into the atmosphere and free-falling back to Earth, colliding into the Mega-Kaiju and killing it at the last second; Jake and Amara survive by transferring to Scrapper. Enraged at the Mega-Kaiju's death, Newt attempts to initiate a "Plan B" but is knocked out and captured by Nate. Later, Jake speaks with Newt, who warns of the Precursor's return. Jake states that humanity is preparing for the upcoming war.

Cast

 John Boyega as Jake Pentecost, the son of Stacker Pentecost, the adoptive younger brother of Mako, and Nate and Amara's partner.
 Scott Eastwood as Nathan "Nate" Lambert, Jake's estranged co-pilot and partner who piloted the Gipsy Avenger.
 Jing Tian as Liwen Shao, a businesswoman and technologist who joins the PPDC against the Precursor Emissary.
 Cailee Spaeny as Amara Namani, a street orphan who created a civilian Jaeger, Scrapper, and piloted the Jaeger Bracer Phoenix. She later becomes Jake's partner after Nate is injured by the Mega-Kaiju.
 Madeleine McGraw as Young Amara
 Rinko Kikuchi as Mako Mori, the adoptive older sister of Jake and the former pilot of Gipsy Danger who is now the secretary general of the reorganized PPDC and the senator of Japan working with Hermann.
 Burn Gorman as Hermann Gottlieb, a scientist and officer who stayed and continued to work in PPDC with Mako.
 Adria Arjona as Jules Reyes, an officer of the PPDC.
 Max Zhang as Marshal Quan Chenglei, a commanding officer in the PPDC.
 Charlie Day as Dr. Newton 'Newt' Geiszler, a former scientist and officer in the PPDC who becomes the emissary of the Precursors after his mind is possessed by them.
 Wesley Wong as Ou-Yang Jinhai, Viktoriya and Amara's partner and cadet who piloted the Jaeger Bracer Phoenix.
 Karan Brar as Suresh Khuran, Ilya's partner and cadet who piloted the Jaeger Guardian Bravo.
 Ivanna Sakhno as Viktoriya Malikova, Ou-Yang's partner, a cadet who piloted the Jaeger Bracer Phoenix and starts out as Amara's rival.
 Mackenyu as Ryoichi Hatayama, Renata's partner and cadet who piloted the Jaeger Saber Athena.
 Lily Ji as Meilin Gao, a cadet in the PPDC.
 Shyrley Rodriguez as Renata Gutierrez, Ryoichi's partner who piloted the Jaeger Saber Athena. 
 Rahart Adams as Tahima Shaheen, a cadet in the PPDC.
 Levi Meaden as Ilya Zaslavsky, Suresh's partner and cadet who piloted the Jaeger Guardian Bravo.
 DeKnight cameos as a PPDC general on a recruitment banner.

Production
Development
In 2012, prior to the first film's release, del Toro noted that he had ideas for a sequel, noting in 2014 that he had been working on a script with Zak Penn for several months. In June 2014, del Toro stated that he would direct the sequel, and the film's distributor was taken by Universal Pictures. In July 2015, it was reported that filming was expected to begin in November, though production was halted following conflicts between Universal and Legendary. As the sequel's future became unclear, Universal indefinitely delayed the film. Still determined to have the film made, del Toro kept working and by that October announced that he had presented the studio with a script and a budget.

After the sale of Legendary to Chinese Wanda Group for $3.5 billion, observers noted an increased likelihood of Pacific Rim 2s production being revitalized because the first film was so successful in China.

In February 2016, the studio, and del Toro himself via Twitter, announced that Steven S. DeKnight would take over directing duties, with a new script written by Jon Spaihts, marking DeKnight's feature directorial debut. Del Toro remained on the project as a producer. Derek Connolly was brought in on May 12, 2016, to rewrite the script again.

Casting
Cast announcements began in June 2016, with John Boyega accepting a role, and news that Scott Eastwood was in talks appearing later that month. Further announcements took place in September and November. A notable absence from the cast was Charlie Hunnam, who could not join the project because of his scheduling conflicts with King Arthur: Legend of the Sword.

Filming
Principal photography on the film began on November 9, 2016, in Australia. On December 14, 2016, the official title was revealed to be Pacific Rim Uprising. In January 2017, John Boyega was photographed in his costume in Sydney. In February 2017, three new Jaegers for the film were revealed.<ref>{{cite web|url=http://www.pacificrim2-movie.com/news/first-look-at-pacific-rim-uprisings-new-jaegers|title=First look at Pacific Rim Uprising's new Jaegers!|website=Pacific Rim 2 Movie News|date=February 9, 2017|author=Chris|access-date=April 20, 2018|archive-date=April 7, 2017|archive-url=https://web.archive.org/web/20170407143719/http://www.pacificrim2-movie.com/news/first-look-at-pacific-rim-uprisings-new-jaegers|url-status=dead}}</ref> On March 8, 2017, filming started in China. The Battle of Tokyo sequence was filmed in Seoul and Busan in South Korea using drones. Filming was completed on March 30, 2017.

Visual effects
The visual effects were done by DNEG (Double Negative), Atomic Fiction, Blind LTD and Territory Studio, with Peter Chiang and Jim Berney serving as visual effects supervisors. Production designer Stefan Dechant tried to push "the look and the feel" of the Jaegers, stating that while in the original film they resembled tanks, the new generation of robots tried to be more like a fighter jet, adding more speed and strength and combining them into one. The robots became more acrobatic and had silhouettes and color schemes that allowed them to become distinct and recognizable. Artists from Industrial Light & Magic, who made the effects in the first film, helped develop Gipsy Avenger, a "sleek and advanced" upgraded version of Gipsy Danger which DeKnight often compared to the USS Enterprise in being "awe-inspiring" given its status as the Jaeger flagship.

Music

Composer John Paesano was originally slated to be writing the score for the film, replacing the first film's composer Ramin Djawadi. However, in January 2018, it was announced that Paesano had been replaced by Lorne Balfe, who recorded his score at Synchron Stage in Vienna. The soundtrack was digitally released on March 23, 2018, by Milan Records with the physical format being released later on April 6, 2018.

Marketing
Legendary Comics released Pacific Rim: Aftermath on January 17. 2018. The six-issue comic book series serves as a bridge between the two films.

On March 13, Titan Books released Pacific Rim Uprising: Ascension, a prequel novel written by Greg Keyes.

Release
TheatricalPacific Rim Uprising was released on March 23, 2018 in the United States, in 3D and IMAX. The film was originally scheduled to be released on April 7, 2017, August 4, 2017, and February 23, 2018.

Home mediaPacific Rim Uprising was released on Digital on June 5, 2018. A 4K Blu-ray, a Blu-ray 3D, a Blu-ray and a DVD was released on June 19, 2018.

 Reception 
Box officePacific Rim Uprising grossed $59.6 million in the United States and Canada, and $230.9 million in other territories, for a worldwide total of $290.5 million, against a production budget of about $150 million. Deadline Hollywood estimated that the film would have needed to gross $350 million to break even.

In the United States and Canada, the film was released alongside Midnight Sun, Sherlock Gnomes, Unsane, and Paul, Apostle of Christ, and was projected to gross $22–29million from 3,703 theaters in its opening weekend. The film made $2.35million from Thursday night previews, down from the original's $3.5million, and $10.4 million on its first day (including previews). It went on to debut to $28 million, becoming the first film to dethrone Black Panther (which made $16.7 million in its sixth week) for the top spot. It fell 67% to $9.2 million in its second weekend, finishing 5th.

In Korea, the film ranked first on March 22, with 82,486 admissions. In China, the film opened at number one, grossing $21.36million on its first day and $25.84million on its second, for a two-day gross of $48.59million. It went on to have a debut of $65 million in the country, as well as $6.9 million in Korea, $6.8 million in Russia and $4.9 million in Mexico, for an international opening weekend of $122.5 million.

 Critical response 
 On Metacritic, the film has a weighted average score of 44 out of 100 based on 45 critics, indicating "mixed or average reviews". Audiences polled by CinemaScore gave the film an average grade of "B" on an A+ to F scale, with PostTrak reporting filmgoers gave it an overall positive score of 76%.

Mark Kennedy of the Associated Press called the film "cheer-at-the-screen fun" and awarded it 3.5 out of 4 stars, lauding Boyega's performance and his chemistry with Spaeny, while also commending DeKnight for using daylight instead of the rainy night settings of del Toro. Ethan Sacks of New York Daily News gave the film 3 out of 5 stars, and was also positive of Boyega's and Spaeny's performances, comparing Boyega's character to Han Solo. However, he criticized the dense backstories of the characters, noting that, "a movie about massive monster-fighting robots doesn't need so much engineering."

Richard Roeper of the Chicago Sun-Times gave the film 2 out of 4 stars, saying: "The climactic battle drags on forever and looks like a high-tech update of a monster movie clash of the titans from a half-century ago. Even the sight of the residents of Tokyo scrambling for their lives as a giant lizard monster stomps through the city serves only as a reminder we're sitting through a glorified B-movie with nothing new to say." David Ehrlich of IndieWire gave the film a "C−", calling it a "generic and diverting sequel that corrects some of the original's biggest mistakes while also highlighting some of its more eccentric charms."

Cary Darling of the Houston Chronicle gave it 1.5 out of 5 stars and called it the worst film of 2018 so far, being especially critical of its bland premise and pandering attempt at international marketability. Darling concluded, "Pacific Rim Uprising is a lot like the city-crunching monsters it stars: big, loud and as dull-witted as Homer Simpson roused from a medically induced coma. It's a rote, paint-by-numbers blockbuster that would be offensive in its mediocrity if it also weren't so relentlessly uninspired," and "all that's left is the robot brawling and the marketing." Ignatiy Vishnevetsky of The A.V. Club called the film an "impersonal sequel," stating "simply put, it lacks its predecessor's curiosity about its world—its fascination with colorful backdrops and machines. Del Toro's movie [...] had an idealistic vision for its anime-influenced hobby-store pursuits [...] Pacific Rim Uprising offers only its spare parts." Similarly, Mick LaSalle of the San Francisco Chronicle noted that "DeKnight doesn't attempt to invest his monsters with majesty, the way Guillermo del Toro did in the previous film. With DeKnight it's just a lot of pounding, smashing and driving, purely functional."

AccoladesPacific Rim Uprising was nominated in two categories at the 2018 Golden Trailer Awards: "Untouchable" (Inside Job) for Best Music and "Pacific Rim Uprising" (AV Squad) for Best Sound Editing. At the 2018 Teen Choice Awards, it received nominations for Choice Action Movie and Choice Action Movie Actor (Boyega).

Future
Canceled sequel
In October 2017, five months before the film's release, DeKnight stated "If enough people show up to this, we've already talked about the plot of the third movie, and how the end of the third movie would expand the universe to a Star Wars/Star Trek-style [franchise or series] where you can go in many, many different directions... You can go main canon, you can go spin-offs, you can go one-offs. Yeah, that's the plan." DeKnight also talked about the possibility of a crossover with the MonsterVerse, as co-writer T.S. Nowlin is a member of its writers room. As of January 2021, del Toro has "no plans to return" for a third installment.

Animated series
On November 8, 2018, Netflix announced Pacific Rim: The Black'', an original anime series that expands upon the story and universe of the two live-action movies. The first 7-episode season was released on March 4, 2021, the second and final season was released on April 19, 2022.

Notes

References

External links

 
 
 

Pacific Rim (franchise)
2018 films
2018 3D films
2018 action thriller films
2018 science fiction action films
2010s monster movies
Alien invasions in films
American monster movies
American robot films
American science fiction action films
American science fiction adventure films
American sequel films
Apocalyptic films
Brain–computer interfacing in fiction
Drone films
American dystopian films
Films about orphans
Films about technology
Films about parallel universes
Films produced by Guillermo del Toro
Films produced by Thomas Tull
Films scored by Lorne Balfe
Films set in 2035
Films set in China
Films set in Japan
Films set in Santa Monica, California
Films set in Shanghai
Films set in Siberia
Films set in Sydney
Films set in Tokyo
Films set in the 2030s
Films set in the future
Films shot in China
Films shot in Tokyo
Films shot in Shanghai
Films shot in Sydney
Films shot in Tibet
Giant monster films
IMAX films
Kaiju films
Mecha films
Legendary Pictures films
Universal Pictures films
Films with screenplays by Emily Carmichael (filmmaker)
2018 directorial debut films
Japan in non-Japanese culture
Films shot on the Gold Coast, Queensland
2010s English-language films
2010s American films